Catharanthus scitulus is a species of flowering plant in the family Apocynaceae. It is endemic to Madagascar.

References	

scitulus
Endemic flora of Madagascar